Fag Patrol is a collection of acoustic Xiu Xiu tracks. Originally, it was only released on CD.
A limited edition vinyl was released on January 15, 2021.

Track listing

References

External links
Amazon.com listing

Xiu Xiu albums
2003 compilation albums